North Heath is a hamlet in the Horsham District of West Sussex, England. It lies just off the A29 road 1.9 miles (3 km) north of Pulborough.

The Brinsbury Campus of Chichester College occupies 250 hectares with a working farm and horticultural and equestrian teaching facilities.

References

External links

Horsham District
Villages in West Sussex